Shanika Karunasekera is a Professor in the School of Computing and Information Systems at the University of Melbourne. Dr. Karunasekera completed her Ph.D. in Electrical Engineering from the University of Cambridge, UK in 1995. Earlier she completed her B.Sc. in Electronics and Telecommunication Engineering at the University of Moratuwa, Sri Lanka.

Dr. Karunasekera was born in Sri Lanka.

External links 
 DBLP Profile
 Google Scholar page

References 

Year of birth missing (living people)
Living people
Sri Lankan emigrants to Australia
Academic staff of the University of Melbourne
Alumni of the University of Cambridge